MohammadHossein AkbarMonadi (born January 31, 1996) is an Iranian footballer who plays as a goalkeeper for Saipa in the Persian Gulf Pro League.

References

Living people
1996 births
Association football goalkeepers
Iranian footballers
Saipa F.C. players
People from Dorud